This is a list of notable alumni from New Trier High School, a four-year high school in Winnetka, Illinois, a northern suburb of Chicago, including alumni from the former New Trier East and New Trier West high schools:

Business
 Bobbi Brown, make-up artist, entrepreneur, author, and founder of a line of cosmetics
 Douglas Conant, former chairman of Avon Products; former President and CEO of the Campbell Soup Company
 Chris Cox (2000), Chief Product Officer (CPO) of Facebook
 John Donahoe (1978), president and CEO of Nike (2020–present), president and CEO of eBay (2008–2015), chairman of PayPal (2015–present), CEO of ServiceNow (2017–2019)
 Christie Hefner (1970), former CEO of Playboy Enterprises
 Charles F. Knight (1953), chairman emeritus of Emerson Electric Co.
 James McNerney (1967), president of GE Lighting (1995–97), president of GE Aircraft Engines (1997–2000), president and CEO of 3M (2000–05), CEO of Boeing (2005–15)

Film, television, and theater
 Ann-Margret (1959), actress and entertainer
 Adam Baldwin (1980), actor
 Steve Barancik (1979), screenwriter 
 Ralph Bellamy (1922), actor
 Beck Bennett (2003), Saturday Night Live cast member
 Carlos Bernard (1980), actor
 Mark Boone Junior (1973), actor
 John Byrum (1965), film producer, director and screenwriter
 Liz Callaway (1978), musical theatre actress
 Katie Chang (2013), actress
 William Christopher, actor
 Lisa Darr (1981), actress
 Bruce Dern (1954), actor
 Christine Ebersole (1971), actress and singer
 James Eckhouse, actor
 Neal Edelstein (1987), film director and producer
 Charlton Heston (1941), actor and political activist
 Rock Hudson (1943), actor
 Jake Johnson (1996), actor, comedian, screenwriter
 Mike Kelley (1985), television writer and producer
 Virginia Madsen (1979), actress
 Lauren Marcus (attended; transferred to another school), actress
 Liesel Matthews (2002), actress and heiress
 Kim Milford (1968), actor
 Penelope Milford (1966), actress
 John R. Montgomery (1975), television producer
 Hugh O'Brian (did not graduate), actor
 Jeffrey Price, member of screenwriting team with Peter S. Seaman
 Maeve Quinlan (1982), actress, producer
 Kevin Quinn (2015), actor and singer-songwriter
 Betsy Randle (1968), actress
 Mark Romanek (1977), music video and film director, writer, and producer
 Charlotte Ross, actress
 Tom Rubnitz, video artist
 Mary Kate Schellhardt (1997), actress
 Rusty Schwimmer (1980), actress
 Michael Shannon, actor
 Les Shapiro, NBC, CBS, ESPN sports journalist, Denver
 Hal Sparks (1988), actor and comedian
 David Strassman (West), performer and ventriloquist
 Lili Taylor (1985), actress
 Nico Tortorella (2006), actor
 Paul Thomas (director) (aka Phil Toubus) 1967, actor, director
 Jim True-Frost (aka Jim True) (1984), actor
 Rainn Wilson (1984), actor
 Terence H. Winkless, film and TV producer, director and writer
 Edward Zwick (1970), film and television director and producer

Journalism and letters
 Elizabeth Brackett (1959), television news correspondent
Shams Charania (2012), NBA reporter, previously for Yahoo Sports The Vertical, currently for The Athletic and Stadium
 Ann Compton (1965), television news reporter and correspondent
 Chet Coppock (1966), radio sportscaster
 Brian D'Amato (1976), novelist and sculptor
 Alan Goldsher (1984), novelist and ghostwriter
 Walter Jacobson (1955), local television news personality
 Geoffrey A. Landis (1973), engineer and Hugo and Nebula Award-winning science fiction author
Edward Lifson (1974) award-winning journalist, for National Public Radio and other outlets, and architecture writer
 Archibald MacLeish (did not graduate), writer and three-time Pulitzer Prize winner
 Nell Minow (1970), film critic and author in the field of corporate governance
 Stephen Moore (1978), economics writer, journalist and commentator
 Henry H. Neff (1991), author and illustrator
 Juliet Law Packer (1970), television writer
 Chris Plante, television reporter, host of eponymous radio show
 Dan Ponce (1995) WGN-TV/News/Anchor; Founder, "Straight No Chaser" a cappella music group.
 Ian Punnett (1978), radio personality and writer
 Sarah Ruhl (1992), playwright
 Thomas A. Stewart (1966), business journalist and editor
 John Stossel (1965), author, commentator and investigative journalist
 Penelope Trunk (1985), author, blogger, and entrepreneur
 Scott Turow (1966), lawyer and novelist
 Donovan Webster (1977), journalist, author, editor, and filmmaker

Law
 Richard Clifton (1968), Senior United States Circuit Judge of the United States Court of Appeals for the Ninth Circuit
 Martha Minow (1972), former Dean of Harvard Law School
 Dean A. Pinkert (1974), trade lawyer; former member of the United States International Trade Commission

Music
 David Charles Abell (1976), conductor
 Mike Bloomfield (did not graduate), rock and blues guitarist
 Andy Brick (1983), composer and conductor
 Ann Hampton Callaway (1976), singer and songwriter
 Marshall Chess, music executive and producer
Kristine Flaherty (2003), rapper
 Katie Gavin (2011), lead singer of the band, MUNA
 Jeff Harnar (1977), cabaret singer
 Erwin Helfer (1954), boogie woogie and jazz innovator, performer, and educator
 Al Jourgensen (attended), musician
 Kate Liu (2012), pianist, 3rd prize winner of XVII International Chopin Piano Competition
 Louis The Child, musical duo composed of Robert Hauldren (2015) and Frederic Kennett (2016)
 Gary Novak, session drummer
 Sean O’Keefe (1998), record producer, mixer and engineer
 Liz Phair (1985), singer-songwriter
Matthew Polenzani (1986), lyric tenor opera singer
 Dave Samuels (1966), jazz vibraphonist who played with Spyro Gyra and the Caribbean Jazz Project
 John Baker Saunders (1973), founding member and bassist for the grunge rock supergroup Mad Season
 William Susman (1978), composer of concert and film music
 Joe Trohman (2002), guitarist for the bands The Damned Things and Fall Out Boy
 Peter Van de Graaff (1979), musician, bass baritone and classical radio host on WFMT
 Matt Walker (1987), rock musician and former drummer for The Smashing Pumpkins
 Aaron Weinstein (2003), jazz violinist
 Pete Wentz (attended), bassist for the bands Black Cards and Fall Out Boy
 The Ying Quartet, string quartet started by four siblings who are all alumni: David (1981), Tim (1983), Phillip (1986), and Janet (1988)

Politics and government
 Judy Biggert (1955), U.S. Representative
 Bob Dold (1987), U.S. Representative
 Rahm Emanuel (West, 1977), U.S. Representative, White House Chief of Staff and Mayor of Chicago, United States Ambassador to Japan 
 David H. Hoffman (1984), federal prosecutor and Chicago's inspector general
 Mark Kirk (1977) U.S. Representative and Senator
 Thomas Miller (1966), U.S. Ambassador to Bosnia and Herzegovina (1999–2001) and Greece (2001–04)
 Charles H. Percy (1937), U.S. Senator
 Michael S. Rogers (1977), U.S. Navy four-star admiral and former director of the National Security Agency
 Carol Ronen (1962), Illinois State Representative and State Senator
 Donald Rumsfeld (1950), U.S. Representative, White House Chief of Staff and U.S. Secretary of Defense
 Jack Ryan, former candidate for U.S. Senate in Illinois
 James D. Swan, Wisconsin State Senator
 Richard S. Williamson (1967), U.S. Ambassador and diplomat

Science and technology
 Bruce Alberts (1956), biochemist, president of the National Academy of Sciences and editor in chief of the journal Science
 Lise Eliot (1980), professor of neuroscience and author 
 Ellen Fetter (1957), computer scientist
 Todd Golub (1981), cancer researcher, director of the cancer program at the Broad Institute
 Mary-Claire King (1963), geneticist
 Geoffrey A. Landis, aerospace engineer and author
 Michael Peskin (West, 1969), physicist
 Martin Rocek (1971), physicist
 Rafael Sorkin (valedictorian 1963), physicist
 Jack Steinberger (1938), co-recipient of the 1988 Nobel Prize in Physics (he donated his Nobel medal to the New Trier science department)
 Kenneth S. Suslick (1970), chemist
 Clifford Tabin (1972), geneticist, chairman of the Department of Genetics at Harvard Medical School, elected member of the National Academy of Sciences, elected a Foreign Member of the Royal Society

Sports
Trish Andrew (1989), basketball player for Michigan
 Ross Baumgarten (1973), baseball pitcher
 Ben Braun (1971), men's collegiate basketball coach, University of California (1996–2008), Rice (2008–14)
 Pete Burnside (1948), baseball pitcher
 John Castino (1973), baseball infielder
 Al Culver, NFL offensive tackle
 Rick Hahn (1989), MLB general manager of the Chicago White Sox
 Mike Huff (1981), baseball outfielder
 Dave Jauss, baseball coach and scout
 Robert Jeangerard, basketball player, 1956 Olympics gold medalist
 Matt Kaskey (2015), offensive tackle for the Carolina Panthers
 Chuck Lindstrom, baseball catcher and coach
 Matt Lottich (2000), basketball player for Stanford, current head coach at Valparaiso University
 Clay Matthews (1974), NFL linebacker (1978–93)
 Chuck Mercein (1961), NFL running back
 Phoebe Mills, athlete, gymnastics bronze medalist in 1988 Summer Olympics
 John Moore (2009), NHL player
 Mike Pyle (1957), NFL center
 Jack Riley (1933), Olympic wrestler and NFL offensive tackle
 Fred Schmidt, swimmer
 Charlie Tilson (2011), MLB outfielder for Chicago White Sox
 Emma Vlasic (2015), ice hockey forward
 Tommy Wingels (2006), NHL player

Visual arts
 Ivan Albright, painter associated with magic realism
 Stieg Hedlund (1983), game development leader, designer, artist, and writer
 Dewitt Jones, photographer and film producer known for his association with the National Geographic Society
 Nancy Spero (1944), feminist artist
 Ryan Zoghlin (1985), artist and photographer

Others
 Liz Crokin, columnist and conspiracy theorist
 Laurie Dann (1975), perpetrator of a school shooting in Winnetka
 Ari Emanuel, talent agent and founder of the Endeavor Agency
 Anna Halprin (Ann Schuman) (1938), modern dancer
 Fred Karger (1968), Republican gay rights advocate
 Sharon Percy Rockefeller, former First Lady of West Virginia and the chief executive officer of WETA-TV
 Benjamin Nathaniel Smith, white supremacist spree killer
 Larry Sweeney (1999), real name Alex Whybrow, professional wrestler and manager
 Charlie Trotter (1977), chef, restaurateur and author
 Brad Will (1988), anarchist, activist, and documentary filmmaker who was killed in Mexico

References

Lists of American people by school affiliation
Lists of people by educational affiliation in Illinois